Víctor Felipe Paredes Guerra (20 April 1944 – 26 January 2022) was a Peruvian academic and politician.

Biography
A member of Cambio 90 and the Popular Force, he served in the Congress of the Republic of Peru from 1990 to 1992 and was its President from 1990 to 1991. He was also Minister of Health from 1991 to 1993. 

He died from COVID-19 in Lima on 26 January 2022, at the age of 77.

References

1944 births
2022 deaths
Freemasons
20th-century Peruvian politicians
Members of the Congress of the Republic of Peru
Presidents of the Chamber of Deputies of Peru
Peruvian Ministers of Health
Peruvian academics
Peruvian biologists
Peruvian sociologists
National University of San Marcos alumni
Politicians from Lima
Deaths from the COVID-19 pandemic in Peru